The Suranskoye mine is a large mine located in the south-western Russia in Bashkortostan. Suranskoye represents one of the largest fluorite reserves in Russia having estimated reserves of 2.01 million tonnes of ore grading 42.6% fluorite.

References 

Fluorite mines in Russia